House Armed Services Subcommittee on Cyber, Innovative Technologies and Information Systems is a subcommittee of the House Armed Services Committee in the United States House of Representatives. It was created for the 117th United States Congress.

The Chair of the subcommittee is Democrat James Langevin of Rhode Island, and the Ranking Member is Republican Elise Stefanik of New York.

Jurisdiction

Cyber Security, Operations, and Forces
Information Technology, Systems, and Operations
Science and Technology Programs and Policy
Defense-Wide Research and Development (except Missile Defense and Space)
Artificial Intelligence Policy and Programs
Electromagnetic Spectrum Policy
Electronic Warfare Policy
Computer Software Acquisition Policy

Members, 117th Congress

References

External links
House Armed Services Committee 
Subcommittee page 

Armed Services Air and Land Forces